A merlon is a solid upright section of a battlement in medieval architecture or fortifications.

Merlon may also refer to:
 Merlon, a Super Paper Mario character
 Merlon Mountain, a mountain in British Columbia, Canada
 Merlon Yarde (born 1944), Barbadian cricketer